James "Jimmy" Rhody (July 17, 1896 – 1944) was an American soccer player who earned one cap with the U.S. national team on June 16, 1924, scoring the sole U.S. goal in a 3-1 loss to Irish Free State in Dublin. He was also part of the US team for the 1924 Summer Olympics, but he did not play in any matches.

He was born in Paterson, New Jersey. He played one season, 1922 to 1923, for Harrison S.C. of the American Soccer League.

References

1896 births
1944 deaths
Sportspeople from Paterson, New Jersey
Soccer players from New Jersey
United States men's international soccer players
American Soccer League (1921–1933) players
Harrison S.C. players
American soccer players
Association football forwards